Catherine Delaunay (born 31 October 1969) is a French jazz clarinet player and composer, best known as a leader of Y'en a qui manquent pas d'air. She is also a member of the French Laurent Dehors's big band "Tous Dehors".

Biography
Delaunay grew up in Brittany, France. She started studying the clarinet at the age of six in a local music school. Later on, she studied the piano (1978–1985) and drums (1991 and 1994).
She then studied music at the Conservatoire National de Région de Rennes.

From 1989 to 1995, she studied at the Conservatoire National Supérieur de Musique de Lyon (CNSMD). She studied the clarinet with Jacques Di Donato (where she passed the Diplôme National d'Etudes Supérieures Musicales of clarinet in 1993), Chamber Music with Jacques Aboulker (where she passed the Certificat d'Etudes Spécialisées of chamber music in 1993), Contemporary music (where she passed the Certificat d'Etudes Complémentaires Spécialisées "Atelier instrumental du XXème siècle" in 1993), Composition, Musical Analysis and Harmony with Loïc Mallié, and 5 keys clarinet and chalumeau with Jean-Claude Veilhan (where she passed the Certificat d'Etudes Complémentaires Spécialisées de clarinet ancienne et chalumeau in 1995). From 1991 to 1994, she also studied drums with Jean-Louis Mechali.

While studying at the CNSMD, she performed with Marc Perrone, Laurent Dehors, and Alain Blesing.

Current career
Catherine Delaunay leads and composes music for several bands. She has set music to poems by Malcolm Lowry for her new projects Sois patient car le loup, for which Delaunay plays the clarinet and the diatonic accordion, John Greaves sings and plays the ukulele, Isabelle Olivier plays the harp, Thierry Lhiver plays the trombone, and Guillaume Séguron plays the double bass.
Since 2000, Catherine Delaunay has been leading and composing music for the French fanfare "Y'en a qui manquent pas d'air", in which she plays with Lionel Martin (saxophone), Daniel Casimir (trombone), Didier Havet (sousaphone), and Tatiana Lejude (drums).

Catherine Delaunay is part of many other projects.
She plays in duet with Pascal Van den Heuvel (saxophone), in duet with Tatiana Lejude (drums), and in trio for the group "Trio Plumes" with Edouard Ferlet and Benoît Dunoyer de Segonzac. She also performs regularly with Régis Huby, Laurent Dehors, and Olivier Thomas in the group Tomassenko (with Olivier Thomas singing, Laurent Rousseau on guitar, Michel Massot on tuba and trombone, and Etienne Plumer on drums).

Catherine Delaunay also plays with dancers (Cie Clara Cornil Cie Thierry Thieû Niang), actors (Cie Tomassenko Cie L'oeil du Tigre, "Les Valises", mise en scène Hélène Arnaud, "Le Gris", mise en scène Pietro Pizzuti).

With Pierre Badaroux on double bass, Catherine Delaunay sets to music silent films like Lotte Reiniger's The Adventures of Prince Achmed (Die Abenteuer des Prinzen Achmed, 1926), Dziga Vertov's Man with a Movie Camera (1928), and Vsevolod Pudovkin Chess Fever (La Fièvre des échecs, 1925).

Others
Catherine Delaunay played with many musicians, including Tony Hymas, Nathan Hanson, Donald Washington, Doan Brian Roessler, Simon Goubert, Steve Coleman, Matt Wilson, Daniel Goyone, Claude Tchamitchian, Serge Lazarevitch, Lucia Reccio, Denis Chancerel, Philippe Botta, Archimusic, Dave Burrell, Takayuki Kato, Nobuyoshi Ino, Yuri Kusetsov, Vladimir Volkoff, and Bruno Tocanne.

Discography
Le chien déguisé en vache (2008) avec Pascal Van den Heuvel
Simple Sound (2008), sextet de Régis Huby
Songs from the beginning (2007), Alain Blesing
Plumes (2006), avec Edouard Ferlet et Benoît Dunoyer de Segonzac
Coeur de Lune (2002), avec Y'en a qui manquent pas d'air, avec Lionel Martin, Daniel Casimir, Didier Havet, Bruno Tocanne, Tatiana Mladenovitch-Lejude
Nuit américaine, Lambert Wilson, Maria Laura Baccarini, Stephy Haïk, Régis Huby
Dans la rue, Dentiste, Tu tousses, Dommage à Glenn, Que tàl Carmen, Happy Birthday, Big band de Laurent Dehors
Dis bonjour au monsieur, Cinéma mémoire, Marc Perrone
Tocade'S, avec Bruno Tocanne
Mozart et l'ami Staedler, le Trio de Bassetto, Jean-Claude Veilhan
Les Bulles, avec Daniel Hélin
Aux solitudes, avec Jean-Philippe Goude
La double vie de Pétrichor, trio Guillaume Séguron, Catherine Delaunay, Davu Seru
Daisy Tambour, Tomassenko de Belgique  
Need Eden Acoustic Lousadzac, Claude Tchamitchian  
Apaches (2018), with Sébastien Gariniaux and Pascal Van den Heuvel 
Thollot in Extenso (2018), three pieces in duo with Tony Hymas
L'ogre intact (2019), Pierrick Hardy quartet 
Vol pour Sidney (2020), five pieces with Matt Wilson, Donald Washington, Davu Seru ...

Recordings of music for films
La première fois que j'ai eu 20 ans, Mes amis mes amours, films de Lorraine Lévy
Un petit jeu sans conséquence, film de Bernard Rapp
Le Ciel sur la tête, de Régis Musset
Un couple épatant, film de Lucas Belvaux
Ma vie à l'hôtel, documentaire de Valérie Desnel
La consultation, documentaire de Hélène de Crécy

Footnotes

External links 
 Label Les neuf filles de Zeus
 Catherine Delaunay myspace

1969 births
Living people
French jazz composers
Musical improvisation
French jazz clarinetists
21st-century clarinetists